Katrina Adams and Mariaan de Swardt were the defending champions but did not compete that year.

Debbie Graham and Kerry-Anne Guse won in the final 6–3, 6–4 against Julie Pullin and Lorna Woodroffe.

Seeds
Champion seeds are indicated in bold text while text in italics indicates the round in which those seeds were eliminated.

 Debbie Graham /  Kerry-Anne Guse (champions)
 Ann Grossman /  Tami Whitlinger-Jones (quarterfinals)
 Miho Saeki /  Yuka Yoshida (quarterfinals)
 Sonya Jeyaseelan /  Janet Lee (quarterfinals)

Draw

External links
 1997 Welsh International Open Doubles Draw

1997 Welsh International Open
1997 WTA Tour